This list comprises all players who have participated in at least one league match for Atlanta Blackhawks since the team's first season in the USL Premier Development League in 2009. Players who were on the roster but never played a first team game are not listed; players who appeared for the team in other competitions (US Open Cup, etc.) but never actually made an USL appearance are noted at the bottom of the page where appropriate.

A
  Jon Akin
  Sam Arthur

B
  Thierry Betole
  Blake Brettschneider
  Alandus Brooks
  Mark Buchholz

C
  Alex Caskey
  Troy Cole

D
  Chris Davis
  Fode Diallo

F
  Daniel Fadida

H
  Karl Haggon
  Matthew Hoskins

J
  Sean Johnson

L
  Wilfrid Loizeau
  Long Tan

M
  Michael Mecerod
  Cory Miller
  Justin Moore

O
  Evan O'Dell

P
  Marcel Preis

R
  Ryan Roushandel

S
  Momodou Sanneh
  Kevin Sawchak
  Babayele Sodade
  Caleb Suri

T
  Kyle Timm
  Alhagi Touré
  Boubacar Toure
  Moussa Toure

U
  Brad Usry

W
  Carl Woszczynski

Sources
 

Atlanta Blackhawks
+
Association football player non-biographical articles